Kevin Blackwood is a professional blackjack player, card counter and gambling author. He is best known for his novel, The Counter, and his instructional book, Play Blackjack Like the Pros.

Blackwood has played in the World Series of Blackjack and the Ultimate Blackjack Tour, a televised 10-week blackjack tournament airing on CBS.

Bibliography 
 The Counter (2002)
 A novel following Raven Townsend's quest to earn a million dollars at high-stakes blackjack.
 Play Blackjack Like the Pros (2005)
 Instructional book on winning at blackjack.
 Casino Gambling For Dummies (2006)
 Hands-on guide of insider secrets and tips for maximizing winnings and minimizing losses in the most popular casino games. It is a book for the complete novices in gambling, which includes the basics and the strategies. He also covers manner issues, bluffing and bank roll. He talks about baccarat, blackjack, roulette, slots, craps, poker, keno and bingo. Blackwood narrates horse racing betting and other sports betting.

References

External links 
Blackjack Hero – Kevin Blackwood – Blackjack
 Kevin Blackwood Website

American blackjack players
American gambling writers
American male non-fiction writers
Living people
Year of birth missing (living people)